V. C. Bird International Airport  is an international airport located on the island of Antigua,  northeast of St. John's, the capital of Antigua and Barbuda.

History 

The airport originally was operated by the United States Army Air Forces.

The airport was built as a United States Army Air Forces base around 1941 and named Coolidge Airfield after Capt. Hamilton Coolidge (1895–1918), a United States Army Air Service pilot killed in World War I.

Flying units assigned to the airfield were:

 35th Bombardment Squadron (25th Bombardment Group) 11 November 1941 until November 1942 
 12th Bombardment Squadron (25th Bombardment Group) 23 November 1943 until 24 March 1944 
 4th Tactical Reconnaissance Squadron (Antilles Air Command) 21 May until 5 October 1945

Renamed Coolidge Air Force Base in 1948, it was closed as a result of budgetary cutbacks in 1949, with the right of re-entry retained by the United States. Agreements were subsequently reached with the United Kingdom and, later, the Antigua government upon independence, for the establishment and maintenance of missile tracking facilities. Antigua Air Station was established on a portion of the former Coolidge AFB. , NASA continues to utilize the Antigua facility for launch tracking services on an as-needed basis; and did so for the launch of the Mars Science Laboratory on 26 November 2011.

Upon the closure of the base in 1949, it became a civil airport. It was known as Coolidge International Airport until 1985 when it was named in honour of Sir Vere Cornwall Bird (1910–1999), the first prime minister of Antigua and Barbuda.

In December 2005, the Antigua and Barbuda Millennium Airport Corporation announced it would invite tenders to construct the first phase of a new passenger terminal designed to serve the airport for 30 years. In 2012, they announced the construction of its second terminal.

The new terminal became operational on 26 August 2015. All flights operate from the new facility. The terminal covers 23,000 square meters (247,570 square feet), with four jet bridges, modern security screening facilities, up-to-date passenger processing and monitoring facilities, and a CCTV security system. It contains 46 check-in counters, 15 self-check-in kiosks, 5 baggage carousels, a mini food court, multiple VIP lounges, a bank, retail stores, first-class lounges, restaurants, and other facilities. Other improvements included a newly constructed car park; parallel to the old terminal, along with other airport offices.

Airlines and destinations

Passenger

Cargo

Ground transportation
Taxis and rental cars are available at the airport, although there is no public bus service.

Other facilities 
 The Antigua Outstation of the Eastern Caribbean Civil Aviation Authority is on the airport property. 
The airport includes a mural by Heather Doram, designer of Antigua and Barbuda's national costume.

Statistics 
The airport was opened on August 20th, 2015, and has a processing capacity of 1,700 passengers. The airport is open 24 hours a day and is serviced by more than 17 airlines.

Accidents and incidents 
On 10 May 2004, a LIAT de Havilland Canada DHC-8-311 flight made an emergency landing after one of its wheels fell off shortly after takeoff. The flight operated by the Antigua-based airline had departed from St. Maarten en route to St. Kitts when one of its wheels reportedly fell off. The Dash 8-311 turboprop was diverted to Antigua and was able to land safely on its three remaining wheels, without causing damage to the aircraft. None of the 24 passengers and three crew members were injured. The airline has launched an investigation into the incident.
On 12 November 2008, a LIAT de Havilland Canada DHC-8-311 circled V. C. Bird International Airport in Antigua following reports of landing gear malfunction. The de Havilland Dash 8 -311 aircraft should have landed at the Robert Bradshaw International Airport in St Kitts but was diverted to Antigua because of the problem. It turned out that the landing gear was in order, but the indicators in the cockpit gave a reading that there was a fault. Firefighters, medical personnel and police were on alert but, after clearance, the aircraft landed safely with its 42 passengers and three crew members.
On 7 October 2012, FlyMontserrat Flight 107, a FlyMontserrat Britten-Norman Islander took off and later crashed a few feet off the runway, killing the pilot and 2 of the 3 passengers on board. due to significant contamination of the aircraft's fuel by water.

References

External links

Official website

Airports in Antigua and Barbuda
Saint George Parish, Antigua and Barbuda
Airports established in 1941
1940s establishments in the Caribbean
1941 establishments in North America
1941 establishments in the British Empire